Villa Agnelli and Villa Pesenti is a complex of historical buildings in Forte dei Marmi, Tuscany, Versilia, Italy.

History
In 1926 Edoardo Agnelli - son of senator Giovanni, founder of the FIAT industry and father of Gianni - bought the neo-Renaissance Villa Costanza, built at the beginning of the '900s by the Admiral Morin, an important figure in Italian military history. The Agnelli family spent their holidays here for more than thirty years, commissioning an underground passage to give direct access to the beach, without having to cross the crowded boulevard. This secret passage remains unique in the Versilian territory. 

The bathing establishment, initially, consisted of a tool shed and garage for the family's hydroplane. Today it is one of the most emblematic structures of Forte dei Marmi, preserving the charm that Susanna Agnelli described in her autobiography We always wore sailor suits (1983).

Today, the Villa Agnelli is one of the central areas of the Augustus Hotel & Resort complex, built in the '50s on the foundation of another famous mansion, constructed in the 1930s. The nucleus of the hotel was the Villa Pesenti, a jewel of modern architecture, designed in 1939 by renowned architect Osvaldo Borsani. It is a good example of rationalist architecture, embellished with typical Mediterranean finishes. In 1953 the family added a storey to the Villa, transforming it into the only Luxury Hotel & Resort in Versilia for more than twenty years.  Around the main structure, seven villas were built in the following years, by different artists and architects.

Famous people
Many important artists, actors, sportsmen and prominent cultural figures have spent their vacation in the villas of the Augustus Hotel&Resort: Jimi Hendrix, Charlton Heston, Oriana Fallaci, Eugenio Montale, Francesco Messina, Mario Monicelli, Paul Anka, Vittorio Gassman and many others. 

Buildings and structures in the Province of Lucca
Villas in Tuscany
Forte dei Marmi